Edmund Yong (born 3 July 1936) is a Malaysian sports shooter. He competed in the mixed skeet event at the 1976 Summer Olympics. Other notable achievements include Secretary-General of the Asia Pacific Golf Federation from 1977 to 1996.  Yong was also involved in Vijay Singh's disqualification from the Asian Tour.

References

External links
 

1936 births
Living people
Malaysian male sport shooters
Olympic shooters of Malaysia
Shooters at the 1976 Summer Olympics
Place of birth missing (living people)
Asian Games medalists in shooting
Shooters at the 1974 Asian Games
Asian Games bronze medalists for Malaysia
Medalists at the 1974 Asian Games